In Bayesian statistics, a strong prior is a preceding assumption, theory, concept or idea upon which, after taking account of new information, a current assumption, theory, concept or idea is founded. The term is used to contrast the case of a weak or uninformative prior probability.  A strong prior would be a type of informative prior in which the information contained in the prior distribution dominates the information contained in the data being analysed. The Bayesian analysis combines the information contained in the prior with that extracted from the data to produce the posterior distribution which, in the case of a "strong prior", would be little changed from the prior distribution.

Bayesian statistics